The 1990 African Cup of Nations Final was a football match that took place on 16 March 1990, at the Stade 5 Juillet 1962 in Algiers, Algeria, to determine the winner of the 1990 African Cup of Nations. Algeria defeated Nigeria 1–0 with a lone goal from Chérif Oudjani in the 38th minute to win their first African Cup. The final was a repeat of the 1980 final in Lagos, which Nigeria won 3-0.

Road to the final

Match

Details

External links
Details at RSSSF

Final
1990
1990
1990
1989–90 in Algerian football
1989–90 in Nigerian football
March 1990 sports events in Africa
20th century in Algiers